Campiglossa messalina is a species of tephritid or fruit flies in the genus Campiglossa of the family Tephritidae.

Distribution
The species is found in Korea, Japan, Russia, China.

References

Tephritinae
Insects described in 1937
Diptera of Asia